Lepidolite is a lilac-gray or rose-colored member of the mica group of minerals with chemical formula . It is the most abundant lithium-bearing mineral and is a secondary source of this metal. It is the major source of the alkali metal rubidium.

Lepidolite is found with other lithium-bearing minerals, such as spodumene, in pegmatite bodies. It has also been found in high-temperature quartz veins, greisens and granite.

Description
Lepidolite is a phyllosilicate mineral and a member of the polylithionite-trilithionite series. Lepidolite is part of a three-part series consisting of polylithionite, lepidolite, and trilithionite. All three minerals share similar properties and are caused because of varying ratios of lithium and aluminum in their chemical formulas. The Li:Al ratio varies from 2:1 in polylithionite up to 1.5:1.5 in trilithionite.

Lepidolite is found naturally in a variety of colors, mainly pink, purple, and red, but also gray and, rarely, yellow and colorless. Because lepidolite is a lithium-bearing mica, it is often wrongly assumed that lithium is what causes the pink hues that are so characteristic of this mineral. Instead, it is trace amounts of manganese that cause the pink, purple, and red colors.

Structure and composition
Lepidolite belongs to the group of trioctahedral micas, with a structure resembling biotite. This structure is sometimes described as TOT-c. The crystal consists of stacked TOT layers weakly bound together by potassium ions (c). Each TOT layer consists of two outer T (tetrahedral) sheets in which silicon or aluminium ions each bind with four oxygen atoms, which in turn bind to other aluminium and silicon to form the sheet structure. The inner O (octahedral) sheet contains iron or magnesium ions each bonded to six oxygen, fluoride, or hydroxide ions. In biotite, silicon occupies three out of every four tetrahedal sites in the crystal and aluminium occupies the remaining tetrahedral sites, while magnesium or iron fill all the available octahedral sites.

Lepidolite shares this structure, but aluminium and lithium substitute for magnesium and iron in the octahedral sites. If nearly equal quantities of aluminium and lithium occupy the octahedral sites, the resulting mineral is trilithionite,  If lithium occupies two out of three octahedral sites and aluminium the remaining octahedra site, then charge balance can be preserved only if silicon occupies all the tetrahedral sites. The result is polylithionite, . Lepidolite has a composition intermediate between these end members.

Fluoride ions can substitute for some of the hydroxide in the structure, while sodium, rubidium, or caesium may substitute in small quantities for potassium.

Occurrences
Lepidolite is associated with other lithium-bearing minerals like spodumene in pegmatite bodies.  It is the major source of the alkali metal rubidium. In 1861, Robert Bunsen and Gustav Kirchhoff extracted  of lepidolite and yielded a few grams of rubidium salts for analysis, and therefore discovered the new element rubidium.

It occurs in granite pegmatites, in some high-temperature quartz veins, greisens and granites. Associated minerals include quartz, feldspar, spodumene, amblygonite, tourmaline, columbite, cassiterite, topaz and beryl.

Notable occurrences include Brazil; Ural Mountains, Russia; California, United States; Tanco Mine, Bernic Lake, Manitoba, Canada; and Madagascar.

References

Phyllosilicates
Lithium minerals
Potassium minerals
Aluminium minerals
Monoclinic minerals
Minerals in space group 8
Minerals in space group 12
Mica group
Luminescent minerals
Gemstones
Rubidium compounds